Tash-Bulak is a village in Jalal-Abad Region of Kyrgyzstan. It is part of the Suzak District. Its population was 8,448 in 2021.

Population

References

Populated places in Jalal-Abad Region